Firelei Báez (born 1981) is a Dominican-born, New York City-based artist known for intricate works on paper and canvas, as well as large scale sculpture. Her art explores the Western canon through the elements of non-Western reading. 

Báez's work has been exhibited at the New Museum, New York, NY, the Pérez Art Museum Miami, Miami, Florida, Taller Puertorriqueño, Philadelphia, Pennsylvania, Ruth and Elmer Wellin Museum of Art, Clinton, New York, the Drawing Center, The Bronx Museum of the Arts, Bronx, New York and the Studio Museum, New York, New York. Her work was featured in the United States Biennial Prospect.3 in New Orleans, Louisiana, curated by Franklin Sirmans. She was included in Getty's Pacific Standard Time's LA>LA exhibition, and in the Pinchuk Art Foundation's Future Generation's Art Prize exhibition at the 2017 Venice Biennale.

She has been the recipient of the Joan Mitchell Foundation Award, the Jacques and Natasha Gelman Award in Painting, the Catherine Doctorow Prize for Contemporary Painting, and the Chiaro Award from the Headlands. In 2015, Perez Art Museum Miami organized Firelei Báez: Bloodlines, with an introduction by the museum's Director, Franklin Sirmans, an essay by Assistant Curator María Elena Ortiz, an interview with Naima Keith, and a contribution by the writer Roxane Gay.

Early life and education 
Báez was born in 1981 in Santiago de Los Caballeros to a Dominican mother and a father of Haitian descent, she was raised in Dajabón, a market city on the Dominican Republic's border with Haiti. At the age of 8, she relocated with her family to Miami, Florida. 

Báez received a master's in fine arts from Hunter College, a bachelor's degree in arts from Cooper Union, and studied at the Skowhegan School of Painting and Sculpture.

Career 
Báez works as an artist, and is based in New York City. She known for intricate works on paper and canvas, as well as large scale sculpture. Her art explores the Western canon through the elements of non-Western reading.

In fall of 2015, Báez had two solo museum shows Patterns of Resistance at the Utah Museum of Contemporary Art and Bloodlines at Perez Art Museum Miami. In February 2016, Báez created a participatory installation with museum patrons at the Metropolitan Museum of Art. The program was presented in conjunction with the exhibition “The Power of Prints: The Legacy of William M. Ivins and A. Hyatt Mayor". The installation itself remained on display through March of that year.

Public art
 In 2018, she was commissioned by the Metropolitan Transportation Authority to install two glass-tile platform-level murals and two mezzanine-level murals for the 163 St-Amsterdam Avenue subway station. The intricate, tropical patterns of the artwork, titled The Brief Wonderous Life of Oscar Wao (after a novel by Junot Diaz), refer to Báez' Caribbean background and to the demographics of the neighborhood. The mural imagery includes flowers and vines of tropical and North American plant species; these complex patterns are interwoven with images of "hand symbols" and female figures in the style of Ciguapas from the folklore of the Dominican Republic. Báez describes the work as having a level of "transparency" to Domincans in the neighborhood. The glass mosaic work was produced by Mayer of Munich based on Báez' designs.

Exhibitions 

Báez has participated in several solo exhibitions and shows in the United States and internationally. Her solo shows include Psycho*Pomp (2012), Sheppard Fine Arts Gallery, University of Nevada, Reno; Firelei Báez: Bloodlines (2015), Pérez Art Museum Miami; Firelei Báez: Joy Out of Fire (2018), Schomburg Center for Research in Black Culture and Brooklyn Museum, New York; The Modern Window: For Améthyste and Athénaire (Exiled Muses Beyond Jean Luc Nancy’s Canon), Anaconas (2018-2019), Museum of Modern Art, New York; and Firelei Báez (2021), ICA Watershed, Institute of Contemporary Art, Boston.

She has also participated in a number of group shows and exhibitions, including El Museo del Barrio Biennial (2011-2012), Prospect New Orleans (2014), and the Berlin Biennale (2018).

Her installation, To breathe full and free: a declaration, a re-visioning, a correction (19º36’16.9”N 72º13’07.0’’W, 42º21’48.762’’N 71º1’59.628’’W), shown at the Watershed exhibit space of the Institute of Contemporary Art, was inspired by the ruins of the Sans Souci palace in Haiti. The formerly majestic mansion was constructed by the Haitian revolutionary and former slave Henri Christophe in 1813, who had crowned himself king.

Grants, awards, and residencies 
Báez has received numerous grants, fellowships, and awards, including the College Art Association Artist Award for Distinguished Body of Work (2018), a Soros Art Fellowship (2019), a Smithsonian Artist Research Fellowship (2019), the American Academy in Rome Philip Guston Rome Prize for visual arts (2021), among others. She was one of the 2017 winners of the Future Generation Art Prize.

Notable works in public collections
Amidst the future and present there is a memory table (2013), Ruth and Elmer Wellin Museum of Art, Hamilton College, Clinton, New York
To see beyond it and to access the places that we know outside its walls (2015), San Jose Museum of Art, California
Sans-Souci (This threshold between a dematerialized and a historicized body) (2015), Pérez Art Museum Miami, Florida
Of Love Possessed (lessons on alterity for G.D. and F.G at a local BSS) (2016), Spelman College Museum of Fine Art, Atlanta
To Access the Places that Lie Beyond (2017), Kemper Museum of Contemporary Art, Kansas City, Missouri
Elegant gathering in a secluded garden (or the many bridges we crossed) (2018), Studio Museum in Harlem, New York
Those who would douse it (it does not disturb me to accept that there are places where my identity is obscure to me, and the fact that it amazes you does not mean I relinquish it) (2018), Kunstmuseum Wolfsburg, Germany
An Open Horizon (or the stillness of a wound) (2019), Cornell Fine Arts Museum, Rollins College, Orlando, Florida
Tignon for Ayda Weddo (or that which a center can not hold) (2019), Nasher Museum of Art, Duke University, Durham, North Carolina
the trace, whether we are attending to it or not (a space for each other’s breathing) (2019), New Orleans Museum of Art
Untitled (Central Power Station) (2019), Dallas Museum of Art

Selected publications 

 Firelei Báez: to breathe full and free. Firelei Báez, David Norr, Carla Acevedo-Yates, Mark Godfrey, Legacy Russell, Thelma Golden, Eva Respini. New York: Gregory R. Miller & Co., 2022.

See also 
 List of American artists 1900 and after

References

External links 
 Studio Visit: Firelei Báez, MoMA Magazine

Dominican Republic women artists
1981 births
Hunter College alumni
Cooper Union alumni
Living people
21st-century American women artists
Hispanic and Latino American artists
Mosaic artists
21st-century American sculptors
21st-century Dominica women
Skowhegan School of Painting and Sculpture alumni
Dominica emigrants to the United States
Artists from Miami
People from Santiago de los Caballeros
Miami Jackson Senior High School alumni
Artists from New York City
People from Dajabón